Zaluzhany may refer to the following places in Ukraine:
 Zaluzhany, Drohobych Raion, Lviv Oblast
 Zaluzhany, Sambir Raion, Lviv Oblast
 Zaluzhany, Horodok Raion, Lviv Oblast
 Zaluzhany, Sumy Oblast